Mathar Bunnag (born 28 October 1950)  is a Thai architect who works in Thailand and around the globe under his design studio, Bunnag Architects.

His resort creations have received extensive international recognition and awards.

In 2012 he was designated a National Artist of Thailand in the field of Architecture.  In 2011 he received the a+d Spectrum Foundation of India's Golden Award for Excellence in Architecture.

In 2014 he represented Thailand in the 14th International Architecture Exhibition at La Biennale di Venezia as Curator and Designer for the Thailand Pavilion, titled “ Spirituality — freedom and creativity, a fundamental in Thai Architecture ”

.

Education

He earned a Bachelor of Architecture degree from Silpakorn University, Thailand, where he was personally awarded by His Majesty King Phumiphond as a commendation of excellence in architecture.

At the University of Manitoba, Canada, he studied architecture ideology under Professor Eric Lye Kum-Chew and gained a Master's of Architecture in 1974.

In 1984 he graduated with a Master's of Architecture in Urban Design from the Graduate School of Design at Harvard, USA, earning a distinction for his graduate thesis, under Professor Edward Sekler, “Conservation on Cultural Heritage, Historic Monuments, Urban Space and Meaning in the Historic Core of Thailand”.

In 2012 he was conferred an Honorary Doctorate Degree by Silpakorn University, Thailand.

Academic Works

1984-1986    Senior Lecturer in Architecture at the National University of Singapore 

1986-1988    Honorary Lecturer at the University of Hong Kong

Notable Resort Works
Four Seasons Resort, Chiengmai, Thailand
The Barai, Hua Hin, Thailand 
Phulay Bay, a Ritz-Carlton Reserve, Krabi, Thailand
The Oberoi, Mauritius
Sofitel SO Mauritius
Maia Luxury Resort & Spa, Mahe, Seychelles
Conrad Maldives Rangali Island
Pangkor Laut Resort, Lumut, Malaysia
Four Seasons Resort, Langkawi, Malaysia 
Trident Gurgaon, India
The Roseate, Dusit Devarana New Delhi, India
Cape Weligama, Sri Lanka

References

1950 births
Living people
Mathar Bunnag
Mathar Bunnag
Mathar Bunnag
University of Manitoba alumni
Harvard Graduate School of Design alumni